Melech (מלך) is a Hebrew word that means king, and may refer to:

 Melech (name), a given name of Hebrew origin
 the title of "king" in ancient Semitic culture, see Malik
 the deity Moloch

See also
 King of the Jews (disambiguation)
 Melek, Slovakia
 Melach, a river in Austria
 Mellach, Austria
 Melik, a hereditary Armenian noble title
 Meleth, a nasrani family name in South India related to judeo-Malayalam by ancient Jewish settlements in South India